Moonlighting is a 1982 British drama film written and directed by Jerzy Skolimowski. It is set in the early 1980s at the time of the Solidarity protests in Poland. It stars Jeremy Irons as Nowak, a Polish builder leading a team working illegally in London.

Plot
Arriving in London from Warsaw in December 1981 is master electrician Nowak, who understands the language but not the inhabitants, with three workmen who know no English.  Their task is to gut and renovate a house, for which they have brought what tools they can carry, while Nowak has cash to buy materials.  Since the whole operation is illegal, Nowak keeps them working indoors while he goes out to get food and supplies.

As his money runs out, he takes to stealing so that the four can survive. In the meantime, Poland is undergoing the traumas of demonstrations and strikes followed by the declaration of martial law, banning of Solidarity and mass arrests.  All this Nowak conceals from the men, in order to finish the job.  With no money left, they have a six-hour walk to the airport and a flight home to an uncertain future.

Cast

Reception
It was entered into the 1982 Cannes Film Festival, where it won the award for Best Screenplay.

Roger Ebert gave it four stars out of four and included it in his list of Best Movies of 1982. Gene Siskel called it his favorite movie of 1982. Vincent Canby, in The New York Times, called Moonlighting "immensely rewarding". He added: "It may be a coincidence - maybe not - that two of the best films ever made about exile have been made by Polish directors", the other being Polanski's The Tenant (1976). Dave Kehr of The Chicago Reader called it "a profound, gripping comedy of terror and isolation, oppression and entrapment" with Jeremy Irons delivering "a performance worthy of Chaplin." He would later hail it as a "masterpiece."

Allmovie gave Moonlighting four out of five stars and Rotten Tomatoes gives the film a 100% rating based on 9 reviews.

References

External links

 
 

1982 drama films
1982 films
British drama films
Polish-language films
Films directed by Jerzy Skolimowski
Films scored by Stanley Myers
Films with screenplays by Jerzy Skolimowski
Films about immigration
Films set in London
1980s English-language films
1980s British films